The lupan is a Chinese magnetic compass, also known as a feng shui compass.

Lupan may also refer to:

Lupan (surname)
Lupan River, a tributary of the Motnău River in Romania